Leandros Symeonidis (born 13 August 1937) is a Greek former football player who spent his entire career in PAOK, playing as an left winger.

Symeonidis played 6 games for the Greece national team between 1960 and 1963.

References

External links
ΛΙΓΑ ΛΟΓΙΑ ΓΙΑ ΤΟΝ ΛΕΑΝΔΡΟ

1937 births
Footballers from Kilkis
Greek footballers
Greece international footballers
Association football midfielders
Super League Greece players
PAOK FC players